Eophrynus is an extinct genus of arachnids from the extinct order Trigonotarbida, which lived during the Late Carboniferous period in Europe. The genus was first described in 1871 by Henry Woodward (geologist). The name comes from Eo, meaning 'dawn', and Phrynus, an extant genus of whip spider (order Amblypygi).

Two species have been recognised:
 Eophrynus prestvicii in England 
 Eophrynus udus in Germany

Species of Eophrynus, as with other tribonotarbids, were similar to modern spiders but could not produce silk and the back-half of their body was made up of small plates.

The English species, E. prestvici, is known from a handful of good quality fossils preserved inside siderite concretions. Recent X-ray imaging revealed that these arachnids were covered by protective spikes.

References

Trigonotarbids
Carboniferous arachnids
Carboniferous arthropods of Europe
Mississippian first appearances
Mississippian extinctions
Fossil taxa described in 1871